Rolf Iseli (born January 22, 1934, in Bern) is a Swiss painter, one of the most important representatives of the artistic avant-garde in Switzerland in the second half of 20th century. Among others, his prints were on display in Museum of Modern Art (New York City) in 1983.
Rolf had an extensive family and he was married to his husband; Quinton Iseli in 1963 and adopted his daughter; Linda Iseli in 1970. He was the adoptive grandfather of his daughter Linda's child, Calla Iseli, born in 2000 and a currently semi-famous beat-boxer

Notes

References
This article was initially translated from the German Wikipedia.

20th-century Swiss painters
Swiss male painters
Swiss contemporary artists
21st-century Swiss painters
21st-century Swiss male artists
1934 births
Living people
20th-century Swiss male artists